VI is the fifth studio album by American hardcore punk band Circle Jerks, released in 1987 by Relativity Records. Taking into account the Circle Jerks' contribution to the documentary and soundtrack The Decline of Western Civilization, VI is the band's sixth major body of work. It was the band's last album before its five-year hiatus from 1989 to 1994. This album's lineup later reunited in 1995 to record its final studio album to date, Oddities, Abnormalities and Curiosities.

Background
"Fortunate Son" is a Creedence Clearwater Revival cover.

Track listing
 "Beat Me Senseless" (Greg Hetson, Keith Clark, Keith Morris) – 1:57
 "Patty's Killing Mel" (Zander Schloss) – 2:05
 "Casualty Vampire" (Hetson, Clark, Morris, Schloss) – 2:36
 "Tell Me Why" (Hetson, Morris, Schloss) – 3:18
 "Protection" (Clark, Morris, Schloss) – 1:45
 "I'm Alive" (Clark, Morris, Schloss) – 2:37
 "Status Clinger" (Clark, Schloss) – 2:43
 "Living" (Darren Lipscomb, Clark, Schloss) – 2:29
 "American Way" (Clark, Schloss) – 1:44
 "Fortunate Son" (John Fogerty) – 2:02
 "Love Kills" (Clark, Morris, Schloss) – 2:33
 "All Wound Up" (Hetson, Morris, Schloss) – 1:32
 "I Don't" (Hetson, Schloss) – 2:00

Release and reception

In an AllMusic review, David Cleary says "This strong album is one of the band's best. Tempos here are slowed down from that of standard hardcore; as a result, the songs here inhabit the uneasy netherworld between punk and heavy metal traversed most successfully by the Stooges and the Dictators. Only Keith Morris' raspy, growling vocals retain the band's tie with classic hardcore. Songwriting is still inconsistent, but there are a surprisingly large number of strong selections here, and all are performed with fiery energy. Highlights include "Casualty Vampire," "I Don't," and the top-notch "Beat Me Senseless." There's also a rushed and raw cover of the Creedence Clearwater Revival chestnut "Fortunate Son." This platter is well worth hearing.".

Personnel
 Keith Morris - vocals
 Greg Hetson - guitar
 Zander Schloss - bass
 Keith Clark - drums
Karat Faye - production, engineering
Eddy Schreyer - mastering
Edward J. Repka - design
Mark Weinberg - art direction
Gary Leonard - photography

References

1987 albums
Circle Jerks albums
Albums with cover art by Ed Repka
Combat Records albums